Furanylfentanyl (Fu-F) is an opioid analgesic that is an analog of fentanyl and has been sold as a designer drug. It has an ED50 value of 0.02 mg/kg in mice. This makes it approximately one fifth as potent as fentanyl.

Side effects 

Side effects of fentanyl analogs are similar to those of fentanyl itself, which include itching, nausea and potentially serious respiratory depression, which can be life-threatening. Fentanyl analogs have killed hundreds of people throughout Europe and the former Soviet republics since the most recent resurgence in use began in Estonia in the early 2000s, and novel derivatives continue to appear.

Life-threatening adverse reactions caused by furanylfentanyl use have been observed in Sweden and Canada. At least seven deaths in Cook County, Illinois, have been linked to furanylfentanyl in 2016, with additional deaths in suburban Chicago in 2017.

Detection in biological fluids
Furanylfentanyl may be measured in blood or urine to monitor for use, confirm a diagnosis of poisoning, or assist in a medicolegal death investigation. Commercially available immunoassays are often used as initial screening tests, but chromatographic techniques are generally used for confirmation and quantitation. Blood furanylfentanyl concentrations are expected to be in a range of 1-45 μg/L in victims of fatal overdosage.

Legal status 
Furanylfentanyl is illegal in Sweden as of January 2016.

The United States Drug Enforcement Administration (DEA) proposed a temporary placement of furanylfentanyl into Schedule I of the Controlled Substances Act on 27 September 2016. On November 29, 2016, the DEA issued its final rule, making furanylfentanyl Schedule I.

See also 
 3-Methylbutyrfentanyl
 3-Methylfentanyl
 4-Fluorofentanyl
 α-Methylfentanyl
 Acetylfentanyl
 Acrylfentanyl
 Benzoylfentanyl
 Butyrfentanyl
 List of fentanyl analogues
 Mirfentanil

References 

Anilides
Designer drugs
Mu-opioid receptor agonists
Piperidines
Synthetic opioids
Fentanyl
2-Furyl compounds